The Blohm & Voss BV 222 Wiking (Pronounced "Veeking") was a large, six-engined German flying boat of World War II. Originally designed as a commercial transport, it was the largest German seaplane to attain production status during the war.

Design and development
Prior to World War II, the German airline Luft Hansa had carried out many transatlantic mail flights. Their main interest was passenger transport, and they initiated a program in 1936 for which Hamburger Flugzeugbau offered the Ha 222, a very large flying boat designed by Dr. Richard Vogt. By the time an order for three was received and work began, the company had changed its name to that of its parent company, Blohm & Voss, and the design was redesignated the BV 222.

Construction of the first prototype, V1, began in January 1938, with construction of the V2 and V3 following within weeks. V1 made its test flight on 7 September 1940, carrying the civil registration D-ANTE. The flight characteristics were found to be satisfactory, but with some improvements required. Further trials lasted until December 1940, when the V1 passed into Luftwaffe service, receiving a military paint scheme and the Stammkennzeichen individual alphabetic military aircraft registration code of CC+EQ, later changed to the alphanumeric Geschwaderkennung "wing code" designation of X4+AH, when in service with Lufttransportgruppe (See) 222.

The type had a long flat floor inside the cabin and a large square cargo door aft of the wing on the starboard side, with such a flat floor for the hull interior being a welcome novelty for that era. The usual balance floats for a flying boat design were ingeniously designed as a matching pair of retracting float units per side, which extended from beneath the wing's outer panels in "clamshell" fashion when fully extended, and fit fully flush with the wing panels' undersides when retracted. Only 13 aircraft are thought to have been completed.

Originally powered by Bramo 323 Fafnir radial engines, later aircraft were powered by six 746 kW (1,000 hp) Jumo 207C inline two-stroke opposed-piston diesel engines. The use of diesels permitted refueling at sea by special re-supply U-boats. C-13 aircraft was a sole example fitted with Jumo 205C and later Jumo 205D engines.

Early aircraft were identified as V1 to V8. Production examples were designated C-09 to C-13.

Operational history

After being overhauled at Hamburg, V1 was sent to Athens, from where it carried supplies for the Afrika Korps, making 17 flights between 16 October and 6 November 1941. The V1 was at this time unarmed, and was given an escort of two Messerschmitt Bf 110 heavy fighters.

Following these flights, the V1 returned to Hamburg to have defensive armament fitted, comprising a 7.92 mm (.312 in) MG 81 machine gun in the hull, two turret-mounted 13 mm (.51 in) MG 131 machine guns, and four 7.92 mm (.312 in) MG 81s in waist mounts. The registration was changed to X4+AH at the same time and the V1 formed the basis for the new air transport squadron Lufttransportstaffel 222 (LTS 222). Between 1942 and 1943, the aircraft flew in the Mediterranean theatre, until in mid-February 1943 it sank following a collision with a submerged wreck while landing at Piraeus harbour.

The V2 (CC+ER) made its first flight on 7 August 1941, and after extensive testing was assigned to LTS 222 on 10 August 1942 as X4+AB.

In 1944, the V2 participated in Operation Schatzgräber ("Treasure Seeker"), the code name of a German weather station at Alexandra Land in the Arctic, whose sick crew needed to be evacuated. The BV 222 dropped a spare wheel for a Fw 200 which had sustained damage during landing near the station.

The V3 (initially DM+SD) first flew on 28 November 1941, and was transferred to LTS 222 on 9 December 1941. After V1's sinking, V3 returned to Hamburg where it was armed. It was destroyed along with V5 on 20 June 1943 at Biscarrosse by RAF de Havilland Mosquitos of No. 264 Squadron RAF.

V4, which had an altered height tail, was also assigned to LTS 222 for Africa flights.

V6 was shot down on 21 August 1942 on the Taranto to Tripoli route by a Bristol Beaufighter; V8 was shot down on the same route on 10 December 1942.

The V7 (TB+QL), which made its first flight on 1 April 1943, was fitted with six 746 kW (1,000 hp) Jumo 207C inline two-stroke diesel engines.

Following the Invasion of Normandy in June 1944, the remaining BV 222 aircraft were transferred to KG 200. Of these, C-09 was probably the BV 222 reported to have been strafed and destroyed by Hawker Typhoon aircraft of No. 439 Squadron RCAF on 24 April 1945 at Seedorf. V7 and V4 were scuttled by their crews at Travemünde and Kiel-Holtenau airport respectively, at the end of the war.

C-10 was probably the BV 222 reported shot down southwest of Biscarrosse on the night of 8 February 1944 by a Mosquito of No. 157 Squadron RAF.

One BV 222, V4, is said to have shot down a US Navy PB4Y-1 Liberator of VB-105 (BU#63917) commanded by Lieutenant Evert, on 22 October 1943. Since the war this has often been mistakenly quoted as a BV 222 shooting down an Avro Lancaster.

Japan flights
Following the German invasion of the Soviet Union in June 1941, plans were made to connect Germany and Japan by air using Luftwaffe aircraft modified for very long range flights since commercial flights to the Far East by Luft Hansa were no longer possible, and it had become very dangerous for ships or U-boats to make the trip by sea.

The BV 222 was one of three aircraft considered seriously for the program, along with the Focke-Wulf Fw 200 and the Heinkel He 177. The He 177 was ruled out due to it being considered unreliable and in 1943 the Junkers Ju 290 was selected for the flights.

Postwar
Three BV 222s were captured and subsequently operated by Allied forces: C-011, C-012 and C-013. C-012, captured at Sørreisa in Norway after the war along with V2, was flown by Captain Eric "Winkle" Brown from Norway to the RAF station at Calshot in 1946, with RAF serial number "VP501". After testing at Marine Aircraft Experimental Establishment at Felixstowe it was assigned to No. 201 Squadron RAF, which operated it up to 1947, when it was scrapped.

C-011 and C-013 were captured by US forces at the end of World War II. On 15 August and again on 20 August 1945 LT Cmdr Richard Schreder of the US Navy performed test flights along with the German crew of one of the BV 222 aircraft that had been acquired by the US. In two flights resulting in a total flight time of 38 minutes they experienced four engine fires. While many spare engines were available they were of substandard quality due to the lack of quality alloys near the end of the war, and caught fire easily. Since the aircraft was not airworthy with these engines, the aircraft was taken out to open water and sunk by a navy destroyer.

Other reports indicate the US captured aircraft were flown or shipped to the US. Convair acquired one for evaluation at the Naval Air Station Patuxent River, the intensive studies leading to the hull design of their Model 117 which in turn led to the R3Y Tradewind. Their subsequent fate is unknown.

The V2 aircraft briefly wore US markings in 1946. The V2 aircraft had identification markings from the original V5 aircraft for Operation Schatzgräber. V2 was later scuttled by the British who filled it with surplus waste from the base at Ilsvika to weigh it down. There are plans to raise and restore this aircraft.

Variants
 BV 222A :
 BV 222B : Proposed version powered by 1470 hp (1100 kW) Junkers Jumo 208 diesel engines.
 BV 222C : Production aircraft.

Specifications (BV 222C-09)

See also

References

Notes

Bibliography
 
 
 
 
 
 Green, William. Warplanes of the Third Reich. London: Macdonald and Jane's Publishers Ltd., 1970 (4th impression 1979). .
 
 Krzyźan, Marian. Blohm & Voss BV 222 & BV 238 (Monografie Lotnicze 29) (in Polish). Gdańsk, Poland: AJ-Press, 1996. .
 
 
 
 Smith, John Richard; Anthony L. Kay and Eddie J. Creek. German Aircraft of the Second World War. London: Putnam and Company Ltd., 1972 (revised edition 2002). .
 
 
 Trojca, Waldemar. Blohm & Voss 222 Wiking (Trojca no.10) (In Polish with English captions). Katowice, Poland: Model Hobby, 2001. .

External links

 Warbirds Resource Group
 Luftwaffe Photos

BV 222
1940s German military transport aircraft
Flying boats
High-wing aircraft
Diesel-engined aircraft
Six-engined tractor aircraft
Aircraft first flown in 1940